The 1943 bombing of the Amsterdam civil registry office was an attempt by members of the Dutch resistance to destroy the Amsterdam civil registry (bevolkingsregister), in order to prevent the Nazis from identifying Jews and others marked for persecution, arrest or forced labour. The March 1943 assault was only partially successful, and led to the execution of 12 participants. Nevertheless, the action likely saved many Jews from arrest and deportation to the extermination camps.

Background 
Following the 1940 German invasion and occupation of the Netherlands, everyone aged 15 and older was required to carry an identification card, the persoonsbewijs, with them at all times. Jews had to carry a persoonsbewijs marked with a large J. Resistance members soon started to forge identification cards at a large scale – the largest such operation, led by Gerrit van der Veen, produced some 80,000 forged documents. However, forged documents could be easily detected because they could be compared against the records in the civil registries. Some civil servants were willing to falsify records in the civil registry so that they would match up with forged identification cards. Nevertheless, the civil registries remained a potent weapon in the hands of the Nazis to identify members of the Dutch population who were Jewish, potential members of the resistance or people who could be called up for forced labour duty.

In 1943, a group of resistance members, led by sculptor Gerrit van der Veen and painter and author Willem Arondeus, meticulously planned to carry out a sabotage attack on the Amsterdam civil registry office, with the aim to destroy the records, without causing any loss of life. The mission was particularly difficult because security at civil registries had been tightened up after a similar assault on an office in Wageningen in late 1942. Security guards were now posted at strategic locations in the Amsterdam civil registry office. The group preparing the attack included a number of local artists and medical students, including several Jews and homosexuals, as well as a group of resistance members behind the clandestine publication Rattenkruid.

Bombing 

The assault on the civil registry office at Plantage Kerklaan 36, a former concert hall directly adjacent to the main entrance of Artis zoo, took place on the night of 27 March 1943. Disguised in police uniforms, the resistance group approached the security guards and told them that they had come to search the building for explosives. The guards believed their story and let them in. Two medical students then sedated the guards by injecting them with phenobarbital, and the unconscious guards were carried inside the zoo through a back door.

Once inside the building, the resistance members pulled open all the drawers, piled all of the documents onto the floor and doused them with benzene. They then set off a series of timed explosions, using explosives obtained by resistance operatives from a munitions store at Naarden fortress.

The explosions set the building ablaze. The fire department (which had been tipped off about the assault) eventually arrived, but delayed putting out the fire. When they did ultimately come into action, they completely doused the building in water in an attempt to cause additional water damage to the records.

The daring assault had a significant psychological impact on the residents of Amsterdam as well as the Nazi occupiers. However, it was only partially successful in destroying the civil registry. Only 15% of the records were completely destroyed. In total, 800,000 identity cards were destroyed, and 600 blank cards and 50,000 guilders were removed from the building.

Aftermath 
Following the bombing, the Nazis immediately offered a 10,000 guilder reward to whomever could identify the perpetrators of the assault. Within a week, most of the conspirators had been betrayed to the Nazis and arrested. When Willem Arondeus was arrested in April, he did not reveal the names of his co-conspirators. However the Nazis found a notebook in his apartment listing many of the names, which led to the arrest of most of the resistance members who participated in the assault.

The trial against the resistance members who carried out the assault took place in June 1943 at the Tropenmuseum. Willem Arondeus and 13 others were found guilty and sentenced to death. Two received clemency at the last minute; the other 12 were executed on 2 July 1943. Gerrit van Veen managed to escape capture and continued his resistance activities until his 1944 arrest and execution following an assault on an Amsterdam prison.

Attorney and co-conspirator Lau Mazirel visited Willem Arondeus in prison shortly before he was executed for his role in the assault. Arondeus, who was openly gay, asked her to "tell the world that gays are no less courageous than anyone else." Mazirel went on to become an early proponent of LGBT rights. At the trial, the defense claimed mitigating circumstances for Sjoerd Bakker, Arondeus' partner, claiming that Arondeus had encouraged Bakker to participate since they were involved in an emotional relationship. However, Bakker refuted that claim and was sentenced to death along with the others.

Remembrance 

In 1946, a commemorative plaque designed by Willem Sandberg was affixed next to the front door of the building at Plantage Kerklaan 36, in remembrance of the assault and the resistance members who were executed for their role in it.

Many of the participants were later honoured by the state of Israel with the title Righteous Among the Nations. In 1984, each member of the group involved in the attack was honoured by Queen Beatrix of the Netherlands and awarded the Resistance Memorial Cross (Verzetsherdenkingskruis)

In 2018 the Verzetsmuseum (Resistance Museum) on Plantage Kerklaan in Amsterdam, across the street from the former civil registry office, held an exhibition to mark the 75th anniversary of the bombing.

The events were covered in the documentary Willem and Frieda: Defying the Nazis hosted by Stephen Fry and broadcast on Channel 4 in March 2023.

Participants

Executed 

 Willem Arondeus, painter and author
  (Johannes), an historian
  (Rudolf), a medical student
 Karl Gröger
 
 
 
 
  (Koenraad), an architect
 , a tailor who made the police uniforms that were used as a disguise

Other participants 
 Gerrit van der Veen, escaped, arrested and executed in 1944
 Cees Honig, a medical student, sedated the security guards, sent to Dachau concentration camp but survived
 Willem Beck, a medical student, sedated the security guards, sent to Dachau concentration camp but survived
 Frieda Belinfante, helped prepare the assault, fled to Switzerland and survived
 Willem Sandberg, helped prepare the assault, went into hiding and survived
 Martinus Nijhoff, helped prepare the assault, evaded arrest
 Lau Mazirel, helped prepare the assault, arrested in 1944 but released

References 

1943 in the Netherlands
Explosions in 1943
March 1943 events
1940s in Amsterdam
Dutch resistance
Explosions in the Netherlands
The Holocaust in the Netherlands
Events in Amsterdam